Kalina is a village in General Toshevo Municipality, Dobrich Province, in northeastern Bulgaria.

References

Villages in Dobrich Province